Yeh Dil Maange More or Yeh Dil Maange More means "This Heart Desires More".

Yeh Dil Maange More may also refer to:

 Yeh Dil Maange More!, a 1998 advertising slogan coined for Pepsi by Anuja Chauhan
 Yeh Dil Mannge More, a 2022 Indian television series